Klijndijk is a village in the Dutch province of Drenthe. It is a part of the municipality of Borger-Odoorn, and lies about 7 km north of Emmen.

The village was first mentioned in 1899 as Klijndijk, and refers to Jasper Klijn, the founder to the peat excavation company. The earliest reference was on 8 March 1864 when the birth of Aaltje Klos of Kleindijk was registered.

References

Populated places in Drenthe
Borger-Odoorn